Ammotrechidae is a family of solifuges distributed in the Americas and the Caribbean Islands. It includes 26 described genera and 95 species. Members of this family can be distinguished from members of other families by the absence of claws on tarsi of leg I, tarsal segmentation 1-2-2-(2-4), pedipalps with pairs of lateroventral spines, and by males having an immovable flagellum on the mesal face of each chelicerum. The propeltidium of the Ammotrechidae is recurved.

The common names used for Ammotrechidae are curve-faced solifugids and sand runners. They live in arid regions, such as dune and rocky habitats. They are carnivores which feed mainly on other invertebrates. Ammotrechidae have relatively high metabolic rates, which allow them to be voracious predators. They feed by masticating their prey and sucking out the liquids. They are preyed upon by other vertebrates. Species of Ammotrechidae are found to be cannibalistic. Males and females dig shallow burrows for protection and nesting.

The species in North America are found in the South to Southwest and are rarely longer than 2 inches. Though they can be pests, they are considered beneficial because they feed on scorpions, spiders, and termites.

Genera
, the World Solifugae Catalog accepts the following twenty-six genera:

Ammotrecha Banks, 1900
Ammotrechella Roewer, 1934
Ammotrechesta Roewer, 1934
Ammotrechinus Roewer, 1934
Ammotrechula Roewer, 1934
Antillotrecha Armas, 1994
Branchia Muma, 1951
Campostrecha Mello-Leitão, 1937
Chileotrecha Maury, 1987
Chinchippus Chamberlin, 1920
Cuyanopuga Iuri, 2021
Dasycleobis Mello-Leitão, 1940
Eutrecha Maury, 1982
Innesa Roewer, 1934
Mortola Mello-Leitão, 1938
Mummuciona Roewer, 1934
Neocleobis Roewer, 1934
Nothopuga Maury, 1976
Oltacola Roewer, 1934
Procleobis Kraepelin, 1899
Pseudocleobis Pocock, 1900
Saronomus Kraepelin, 1900
Sedna Muma, 1971
Titanopuga Iuri, 2021
Xenotrecha Maury, 1982
†Happlodontus Poinar & Santiago-Blay, 1989

References

External links
 Ammotrechidae on Solpugid.com
 Family Ammotrechidae - Curve-faced Solifugid on BugGuide.net
 Curve-faced Solifugid from Texas Entomology

Solifugae
Arachnid families
Arachnids of North America
Arachnids of South America